The Kaap River (also Umlambongwane or Little Crocodile River) is a river in the De Kaap Valley of eastern Mpumalanga province, South Africa. It is a tributary of the Crocodile River with which it has a confluence at Kaapmuiden. The Kaap River has two main tributaries, namely the North Kaap River (Afrikaans: Noordkaap) and South Kaap River (Afrikaans: Suidkaap). Its lower reaches cut through the scenic Krokodilpoortsberge, where it has several tributaries, including Figtree creek and Low's creek (or Mantibovu).

History
The catchment area of the river was once inhabited by the Mbayi tribe, or people of Maseko, who were lorded over by the bakaNgomane. Their places of residence can still be recognized by their cairns, the purpose of which is unclear.

See also 
 List of rivers of South Africa

References 

Rivers of Mpumalanga